Horna is a surname. Notable people with the surname include:

Annett Horna (born 1987), German athlete
Kati Horna (1912–2000), Hungarian-born Mexican photojournalist and teacher
Luis Horna (born 1980), Peruvian tennis player

See also
Horne (surname)